Mitewani railway station serves Mitewani  and surrounding villages in Bhandara district in Maharashtra, India.

Railway stations in Bhandara district
Nagpur SEC railway division